Eduardo Victoria (Born September 7, 1970, Ciudad de México, D.F. México), is a Mexican actor.

Filmography

Film roles

Television roles

References

External links

1970 births
Living people
21st-century Mexican male actors
Mexican male telenovela actors
Male actors from Mexico City